Wolterstorffina mirei is a species of toad in the family Bufonidae. It is endemic to Cameroon and known from Mount Oku and the Bamboutos Mountains.
Its natural habitats are montane grassland, and that in the dry season, areas near streams and small watercourses in bamboo forest. It is threatened by habitat loss caused by fire, overgrazing, and agriculture.

References

Wolterstorffina
Frogs of Africa
Amphibians of Cameroon
Endemic fauna of Cameroon
Amphibians described in 1971
Taxa named by Jean-Luc Perret
Taxonomy articles created by Polbot
Fauna of the Cameroonian Highlands forests